Waipoua Settlement is a rural community in the Kaipara District of Northland, in New Zealand's North Island.

It includes the Waipoua Forest, one of the best preserved examples of a kauri forest in New Zealand. It is notable for having two of the largest living kauri trees, Tāne Mahuta and Te Matua Ngahere. Approximately 200,000 people visit Tāne Mahuta every year.

The area has two marae belonging to Te Roroa: Matatina Marae and Tuohu meeting house, and Pananawe Marae and Te Taumata o Tiopira Kinaki meeting house.

Notes

Kaipara District
Populated places in the Northland Region